We Play is the third extended play by South Korean girl group Weeekly. It was released on March 17, 2021, by Play M and distributed by Kakao. The physical version of the EP was made available in two versions: "Jump" and "Up". It contains five tracks, including the lead single "After School".

Background and release 
On February 24, Play M Entertainment released a teaser photo announcing that Weeekly would make a comeback with their third EP We Play.

On March 3–4, they released the concept photos for We Play. On March 8, they released the concept film for We Play. This concept film also revealed "After School" as the lead single. On March 10, the tracklist for We Play was released. On March 12, the highlight medley for the EP was released. On March 15, they released the music video teaser for "After School".

On March 17, We Play was released along with the music video for "After School".

Promotion 
On March 17, 2021, Weeekly held an online showcase from Shinhan Card Fan Square.

Track listing 
Credits adapted from Melon.

Charts

Release history

References 

2021 EPs
Weeekly albums
Korean-language EPs